The England national netball team travelled to Australia in October 2022 for a three-match series against the Australia national netball team. The series had been originally scheduled for October 2021, but was cancelled due to the COVID-19 pandemic.

Australia won the series 3–0, after winning the first match with a thrilling one goal victory in Newcastle.

Squads

Notes
  Gretel Bueta withdrew from the squad on 4 October 2022 after announcing her pregnancy
  Joanna Weston was added to the squad on 18 October 2022 due to injury to Sunday Aryang.

Match officials

Umpires

Umpire Appointments Panel

Matches

First Test

References:

Second Test

References:

Third Test

References:

References

2022 in Australian netball
Australia
International netball competitions hosted by Australia
Australia national netball team series
Australia
October 2022 sports events in Australia
November 2022 sports events in Australia